Trim was a ship's cat who accompanied Matthew Flinders on his voyages to circumnavigate and map the coastline of Australia in 1801–1803.

Biography 
Trim was born in 1799 aboard the ship  on a voyage from the Cape of Good Hope to Botany Bay. The kitten fell overboard, but managed to swim back to the vessel and climb aboard by scaling a rope; taking note of his strong survival instinct and intelligence, Flinders and the crew made him their favourite.

When Flinders was accused of spying and imprisoned by the French in Mauritius on his return voyage to England, Trim shared his captivity until his unexplained disappearance, which Flinders attributed to his having been stolen and eaten by a hungry slave.

Description
Trim was a bicolour cat, being black with white paws, chin and chest. He was named after the butler in Laurence Sterne's novel Tristram Shandy, because Flinders considered him to be a faithful and affectionate friend. During his imprisonment, Flinders wrote a biographical tribute to Trim in which he described him as "one of the finest animals I ever saw... [his] robe was a clear jet black, with the exception of his four feet, which seemed to have been dipped in snow and his under lip, which rivaled them in whiteness. He had also a white star on his breast."

Legacy
Flinders wrote of Trim while still captive on the Isle de France in 1809.

In 1996, a bronze statue of Trim by sculptor John Cornwell was erected on a window ledge of the Mitchell Library in Sydney, directly behind a statue of his owner that was erected following the donation of Flinders' personal papers to the Library by his grandson in 1925. The popularity of the statue has since led to the development of a range of Trim merchandise by the State Library of New South Wales. The Library's cafe is also named after the cat.

The plaque under it says:

which is a part of the epitaph that Flinders had promised Trim.

Trim also features on the first statue of Flinders to be erected in England, which can be found in Donington, Lincolnshire, the birthplace of Flinders, and where it is planned that he will be reburied.

In addition, a large bronze statue of Matthew and Trim stands at Euston Railway Station in London, near where he was originally buried. A cast of the same statue is in Port Lincoln, South Australia, and another cast of the same statue is also at the Flinders University campus in Adelaide, South Australia. A smaller version is on display in Lincoln Cathedral.

In Australian author Bryce Courtenay's 2002 novel, Matthew Flinders' Cat, both the cat and the library statue feature as major characters.

See also
 List of individual cats

Further reading

References

External links 

 Trim the Ship's Cat
 Fictional circumnavigational log.
 Review of "Matthew Flinders' Cat"
 Purr 'n' Fur: Matthew Flinders' cat, Trim
 Trim the Cat. State Library of NSW
 A biographical tribute to the memory of Trim / by Matthew Flinders ; illustrated by Annette Macarthur-OnslowFlinders, Matthew, 1774–1814

Individual cats
Animal sculptures in Australia
1799 animal births
Cat monuments